A mobile soap opera is a soap opera developed for the mobile phone platform.  The series can be viewed by mobile phones, the internet or MSN Messenger.  Subscribers register online and receive two episodes a day, each episode consisting of about 6 or 7 pictures and accompanying text.

Mobile soap opera was first introduced into the Netherlands in 2003 with the series Jong Zuid.  An Australian version of Jong Zuid   called Random Place was launched on 22 April 2005. Featuring  a cast of Australian Olympians, reality TV &  soaps stars including Libby Lenton, Leisal Jones, Nicole Sanderson, Tatiana Gregorieva, Riki Lee Coulter, Amy Erbacher, and starred Marty Worrall, & Daniel O'Connor. Random Place was sponsored by Vodafone and produced by Bill Roberts.

Another mobile Soap FanTESStic produced  in Spain by Telefónica,  was translated and sold into five other markets including UK, Chile & Australia (on April 8, 2005). The concept was awarded the Best Mobile Application Award Europe 2003.

External links 
SMH - Soaps slip into phones
Mobile soap opera - Ericsson Best Mobile Application Award Europe 2003
Bandt.com.au Soap operas get mobile
 Jong Zuid: MSN site of the first Dutch mobile soap opera  (in Dutch)
  Australian Interactive Media Industry Association: Slice Wireless and Endemol Southern Star launch the first mobile soap opera for Australia & New Zealand